Nogometni klub Črenšovci, commonly referred to as NK Črenšovci or simply Črenšovci, is a Slovenian football club which plays in the town of Črenšovci. As of the 2020–21 season, they play in the Pomurska League, the fourth highest football league in Slovenia. The club was founded in 1976.

Honours
Slovenian Third League
 Winners: 1998–99

Slovenian Fourth Division
 Winners: 2013–14, 2016–17

MNZ Lendava Cup
 Winners: 2007–08, 2008–09

References

External links
Soccerway profile

Association football clubs established in 1976
Football clubs in Slovenia
1976 establishments in Slovenia